The Chehalis River  is located in the southwest corner of British Columbia, Canada near the city of Chilliwack. It flows south-eastward out of the Douglas Ranges of the Coast Mountains, draining into the Harrison River.

Though the river's valley is heavily logged—earlier in the 20th century the area was covered by a dense network of logging railways—the river itself flows through a small canyon before a short relatively flat stretch leading to its confluence with the Harrison. The Chehalis is a  fishing stream and, together with its tributaries such as Statlu Creek, offers opportunities for class III and IV whitewater kayaking.

The Chehalis River starts in the mountains above and just west of Statlu Lake, which it soon flows into.  Shortly after exiting the lake, it drops over impressive Statlu Falls, which is difficult to view without putting yourself in real danger.  People have died when they have slipped and fallen over the falls.  After the falls, the river turns south, eventually flowing into Chehalis Lake.  After it exits the lake it continues its journey south to the Harrison River.

The river's canyon and the peaks and cliff-faces of the range encircling its basin, which comprises most of the area of the Douglas Ranges, is popular with rock-climbers and hikers, who call the area "the Chehalis".  There is a small ski resort, Hemlock Valley, on the eastern side of the Chehalis River basin.

A road penetrates the northeast rim of the range into the Harrison Lake basin and on to historic Port Douglas, at the head of that lake, and beyond up the Lillooet River via  Skookumchuck Hot Springs to Pemberton–Mount Currie.  This road, to be named the Sasquatch Highway was proposed to be paved before the 2010 Winter Olympics to connect Hwy 7 (Lougheed Highway) at the community of Chehalis with Hwy 99 (the Sea-to-Sky Highway) at Mount Currie.

See also
 List of tributaries of the Fraser River
 List of British Columbia rivers

References

Canyons and gorges of British Columbia
Rivers of the Pacific Ranges
Rivers of the Lower Mainland
Tributaries of the Fraser River
New Westminster Land District